Alexander Walker Ogilvie (May 7, 1829 – March 31, 1902) was a Canadian politician and businessman. He and his brothers, William and John, are remembered for their pioneering work in the Canadian milling trade with their company, A. W. Ogilvie & Co. of Montreal, and as pioneers and believers in the success of the Canadian West.  Their company expanded to become the largest flour milling company in the British Empire.

He was born in Côte-Saint-Michel, Lower Canada (now Quebec) which is on the island of Montreal, the son of Alexander Ogilvie and Helen Watson. He attended the Howden and Taggart Academy in Montreal. His father and his uncle, James Goudie, operated a flour mill called Glenora Mills on the Lachine Canal. Alexander went into partnership with his uncle in 1852. When Goudie left the firm in 1855, Ogilvie went into partnership with his younger brother, John, forming A. W. Ogilvie & Company.

Their brother, William Watson Ogilvie, joined the company in 1860 to head up the Montreal offices. At this point Alexander was able to devote more time to politics.

In the 1867 Quebec general election, he was acclaimed to the Legislative Assembly of Quebec for the riding of Montréal-Ouest. He did not run in the 1871 election. He left A. W. Ogilvie and Co in 1874. He was elected again in the 1875 election, this time in the riding of Montréal-Centre. He did not run in the 1878 election. In 1881, he was appointed to the Senate of Canada representing the senatorial division of Alma, Quebec. A Conservative, he resigned in 1901.

He was a Justice of the Peace and Lt. Col. of the Montreal Cavalry and a director of  Mount Royal Cemetery. He supported organizations such as the Montreal Workingmen's Mutual Benefit and Widows and Orphans Provident Society, St. Andrew's Society.

Ogilvie died in 1902 and his remains were interred at Mount Royal Cemetery.

References

External links
 
 

1829 births
1902 deaths
Canadian Presbyterians
Canadian senators from Quebec
Conservative Party of Canada (1867–1942) senators
Conservative Party of Quebec MNAs
Pre-Confederation Canadian businesspeople
Canadian people of Scottish descent
Anglophone Quebec people
Canadian justices of the peace
Burials at Mount Royal Cemetery